Makoni North is a constituency of the National Assembly of the Parliament of Zimbabwe, located in Makoni District in Manicaland Province. Its current MP since the 2018 election is James Munetsi of ZANU–PF.

References 

Makoni District
Manicaland Province
Parliamentary constituencies in Zimbabwe